Neelamperoor Madhusoodanan Nair (25 March 1936 – 2 January 2021) was an Indian poet and writer, from Kerala state, South India, who wrote in the Malayalam–language. He received the Kerala Sahitya Akademi Award in the year 2000 for his work Chamatha. His other works include Ithile Varika, Eettillam, Chitha, Amaram, Urangum Munpu and the humorous Phalitha Chinthakal.

References

1936 births
2021 deaths
Writers from Alappuzha
Poets from Kerala
Malayalam-language writers
Malayalam poets
Recipients of the Kerala Sahitya Akademi Award
Government Victoria College, Palakkad alumni
Recipients of the Ulloor Award